Fouradi is a Dutch hip hop duo from Amsterdam, Netherlands. The group is composed of Moroccan-Dutch brothers Mohamed (born 5 January 1982) and Brahim (19 November 1985) Fouradi.

Discography

Albums

Singles

Featured in

References

External links
 Official website

1982 births
1985 births
Living people
Dutch hip hop groups
Dutch rappers
Dutch people of Moroccan descent
Musical groups from Amsterdam